Bādhān ibn Sāsān (in ; also Bādhām  in Islamic historiography) was a Persian abna' leader and the Sasanian governor of Yemen during the reign of Khosrow II (r. 590-628). He ruled from Sana'a.

According to Islamic tradition, during his rule, Muhammad had started preaching the new faith of Islam. Badhan sent reports about this new faith to Khosrow. Muhammad had sent a letter to Khosrow inviting him to convert to Islam. Khosrow tore up the letter and ordered Badhan to send some men to Medina to bring Muhammad to Khosrow himself in Ctesiphon. Badhan sent two men for this task. When these two men met Muhammad and demanded he come with them, Muhammad refused. Instead, he prophesied that Khosrow had been overthrown and murdered by his son Kavadh II, his stomach torn just like he had torn Muhammed's letter. He also prophesied that if Badhan converted to Islam he would be able to keep his throne. The two men returned to Badhan with the news regarding Khosrow. Badhan waited to ascertain the truthfulness of this disclosure. When it proved to be true, Badhan converted to Islam. The two men and the Persians living in Yemen and outside Yemen followed the example of Badhan and also converted to Islam. Thereafter, Badhan sent a message to Muhammad, informing him of his conversion to Islam. He sent messages to various parts of Yemeni Arab settlers of different kingdoms of they had trade link at that time, such as Persian outposts in Ceylon, Malaya, Malayana, Bettella (Potala), etc. and purportedly ordered mosques to be built in those places.

Badhan was succeeded briefly by his son Shahr, who was killed in battle against Al-Aswad Al-Ansi, an apostate who had declared himself as a prophet when Muhammad became ill after his final pilgrimage to Mecca. Ansi attacked San'a and Shahr was killed. He married Shahr's widow and declared himself ruler of Yemen.

See also
 Ancient history of Yemen
 Islamic history of Yemen
 Ridda wars
 Fayruz al-Daylami
 List of non-Arab Sahaba
 Kilakarai
 Old Jumma Masjid Of Kilakarai

References

Sources

External links
 Yemen Explorers
 Yemen, By Daniel McLaughlin pg.9 & 70
 pg.418 Ar-Raheeq Al-Makhtum

7th-century Yemeni people
7th-century Muslims
Converts to Islam
Yemeni Muslims
Sasanian governors of Yemen
7th-century Iranian people
Yemenite people of Iranian descent